Buck Lake 133C is an Indian reserve of the Paul First Nation in Alberta, located within the County of Wetaskiwin No. 10. It is 87 kilometers west of Wetaskiwin.

References

Indian reserves in Alberta